Arthur Francis may refer to:

 Arthur Francis, a pseudonym used by Ira Gershwin (1896–1983), American lyricist
 Arthur Francis (rugby) (1882–1957), New Zealand dual-code rugby player
 Arthur Francis (Glamorgan cricketer) (born 1953), former Welsh cricketer
 Arthur Francis (Middlesex cricketer) (1854–1908), English cricketer
 Arthur Francis (footballer) (1886–1952), Australian rules footballer 
 Arthur Francis (politician) (1828–1902), member of the Queensland Legislative Assembly